Chollas View is an urban community in the southeastern section of the city of San Diego. It is bordered by Webster and California State Route 94 on the north, Mount Hope and Interstate 805 on the west, Emerald Hills and Euclid Avenue on the east, and Lincoln Park and the San Diego Trolley on the south. Major thoroughfares include Market Street and 47th Street.

History
Chollas View is named after the large numbers of Cholla cactus that once
covered the land. Holy Cross Cemetery opened in the area in 1919. During World War II, a defense housing project was built in the neighborhood. The neighborhood began to develop around the housing project in the 1950s.

Demographics
The census tract that includes Chollas View has 4,634 residents. Chollas View neighborhood is 62.2% Hispanic, 17.8% African-American, 15.9% Asian, 4.2% multiracial, 2.8% White, 0.9% Pacific Islander, and 0.7% Native American. Chollas View has a large Laotian American population, with roughly 12% of its residents being of Laotian descent.

Landmarks and facilities
The Holy Cross Cemetery is found in Chollas View.

Education
Chollas View is served by the San Diego Unified School District. Public schools in Chollas View include Gompers Preparatory Academy, Millennial Tech Middle School and Horton Elementary School.

See also

References

Neighborhoods in San Diego